Robert Hamilton McWhorta Davidson (September 23, 1832 – January 18, 1908) was a U.S. Representative from Florida.

Biography
Born near Quincy, Florida, Davidson attended the common schools and the Quincy Academy in Quincy, Florida.
He studied law at the University of Virginia, Charlottesville, Virginia.
He was admitted to the bar in 1853 and commenced practice in Quincy, Florida.
He served as member of the State house of representatives 1856-1859.
He served in the State senate 1860-1862.
He retired from the State senate in 1862 and served during the Civil War in the Confederate States Army as captain of Infantry and later with rank of lieutenant colonel.
He served as member of the State constitutional convention in 1865.

Davidson was elected as a Democrat to the Forty-fifth and to the six succeeding Congresses (March 4, 1877 – March 3, 1891).
He served as chairman of the Committee on Railways and Canals (Forty-eighth through Fiftieth Congresses).
He was an unsuccessful candidate for renomination in 1890 to the Fifty-second Congress.
He served as member of the State railroad commission in 1897 and 1898. Also member of the Florida Public Service Commission (July 1, 1897 - January 3, 1899).
He engaged in the practice of his profession until his death in Quincy, Florida, January 18, 1908.
He was interred in Western Cemetery.

References

Notes

External links 
 

1832 births
1908 deaths
Democratic Party members of the United States House of Representatives from Florida
People of Florida in the American Civil War
People from Quincy, Florida
University of Virginia School of Law alumni
Confederate States Army officers
Democratic Party members of the Florida House of Representatives
Democratic Party Florida state senators
19th-century American politicians